Gianni Bisiach (7 May 1927 – 20 November 2022) was an Italian journalist, television and radio writer, presenter, essayist, documentarist and screenwriter.

Biography 
Born in Gorizia, after getting his degree in Medicine Bisiach enrolled at the Centro Sperimentale di Cinematografia. In the mid-1950s he entered RAI as a collaborator of the news program TV 7. In the late 1970s he started working on radio, where he created the long-standing Radio Uno talk show Radio anch'io, which ran between 1978 and 1992 and had a TV spin-off, also hosted by Bisiach.

In his variegated career Bisiach also directed the documentary film I due Kennedy and a segment of the anthology film I misteri di Roma, and collaborated on some screenplays. He also wrote several books, notably the interview book Pertini racconta in collaboration with Sandro Pertini.

Bisiach died in Rome on 20 November 2022, at the age of 95.

References

External links 
  

1927 births
2022 deaths
People from Gorizia
Italian essayists
Male essayists
Italian television journalists
20th-century Italian writers
20th-century Italian male writers
Rai (broadcaster) people
Centro Sperimentale di Cinematografia alumni
Italian television presenters
Italian radio journalists
Italian radio presenters
Italian television writers
Italian radio writers
Italian documentary film directors
Italian people of Slovene descent
20th-century essayists
Italian male non-fiction writers
Male television writers
Knights Grand Cross of the Order of Merit of the Italian Republic
Sapienza University of Rome alumni